The State Secretary of the South African Republic (Transvaal) was the principal administrative officer of that republic, officially known as the Zuid-Afrikaansche Republiek.

See also 
 State President of the South African Republic
 State Attorney of the South African Republic

References

Bibliography 

 

South African Republic